Ku Ja-ryong (Hanja: 具滋龍; born 6 April 1992) is a South Korean football defender who plays for Jeonbuk Hyundai Motors.

Club career
Ku joined Suwon Samsung Bluewings in 2011 and in 2012, he was transferred to Ansan Police on loan to complete his military service as per South Korean law.

Ku made his league debut for Ansan Police on 12 May 2013 against Chungju Hummel FC.
In September 2013, Ku returned to Suwon Samsung Bluewings.

He played 33 league games for Suwon Samsung Bluewings.

Club career statistics

Honours

Suwon Samsung Bluewings
K League 1 Runners-up(1): 2014

References
football.com

External links 

 
 KFA.or.kr profile

1992 births
Living people
Association football defenders
South Korean footballers
Ansan Mugunghwa FC players
Suwon Samsung Bluewings players
K League 1 players
K League 2 players